Jaideep Mehrotra (born 1954) is an Indian contemporary artist based in Mumbai, India. He started his artistic career with a solo exhibition at the young age of 13 in 1967. Despite having no formal training in art, Mehrotra managed a parallel career of business and painting up until 1983, when he embraced painting as his solitary profession.

Having been a part of the art world for over 4 decades, Mehrotra has worked with a profusion of mediums. His works steer away from conforming to the orthodox approaches. His inventive works are both rich in visual portrayal and intense in intellectual ideology, sometimes including socio-political commentary.

He has served as a judge, panelist, jury member on various awards, competitions and various art events. He has also had work sold at various auctions over the years, including Bonhams, Osian's and Saffronart.

Early life and education 
Mehrotra was born in Mumbai, India. He did his early schooling at St. Mary's, Mumbai and then at Mayo College, Ajmer after which he pursued business studies from the University of Mumbai.

Works 
Pioneer of the digital medium as an art form in India,  Mehrotra has continually pushed the conceptual thresholds of his visual language to integrate different elements in his works – the historical with the contemporary, the traditional with the modern.

The creative quest of not confining to parameters, has driven him to experiment with different mediums and subjects, both within and without the two dimensional. This foray has led him to work with oils, acrylics, fabric, resin, the digital domain of installations, web based art, Giclée, audio-visual depiction and short films.

Prominent exhibitions 
 2003: "Retracked" (Mumbai)
 2005: "Shadow Play” (Singapore)
 2006: “Alchemy of Play” (Dubai)
 2009: "Growing Panes in Solitude" (New Delhi)
 2009: “Transmogrification of a City” (Mumbai)
 2011: “Metonymical Subtext” at Tao Art Gallery, Jehangir Art Gallery (Mumbai)
 2017: “Reflections in Mercury” at Tao Art Gallery (Mumbai)

List of solo exhibitions 
 1967: Chetna Art Gallery (Mumbai)
 1972: Cymroza Art Gallery (Mumbai)
 1976: Taj Art Gallery (Mumbai)
 1983: Taj Art Gallery (Mumbai)
 1985: Max Mueller Bhavan (Mumbai)
 1986: Taj Art Gallery (Mumbai)
 1988: Taj Art Gallery (Mumbai)
 1991: Jehangir Art Gallery (Mumbai); The Gallery (Chennai); Gallery Espace (New Delhi); Chitrakoot Gallery (Calcutta)
 1993: Taj Mahal Hotel, (New Delhi)
 1995: Jehangir Art Gallery (Mumbai )
 1997: Cache' Gallery & Studio 51J (Mumbai) [Exhibitions of Giclee' Prints] Jehangir Art
 1998: Jehangir Art Gallery (Mumbai)
 2002: "Spanish Impressions” (Mumbai)
 2004: Jehangir Art Gallery (Mumbai)
 2005: Asian Civilization Museum – The Arts House (Singapore)
 2006: 1x1 Art Space (Dubai)
 2007: Jehangir Art Gallery (Mumbai)
 2009: Visual Arts Gallery, India Habitat Centre (New Delhi)
 2015: “Cognitivus" at Art Bahrain (Solo Booth, Bahrain)
 2015: Digital Works (launch of Good Homes Art Week, Mumbai)

Group shows 
 1988: “Art for Cry” – Jehangir Art Gallery, Mumbai
 1992: "A Man & A Woman" – Jehangir Art Gallery, Mumbai
 1995: "Bombay"- Jehangir Art Gallery, Mumbai
 1996: "Mother Teresa'" – Jehangir Art Gallery, Mumbai
 1997: "50 years of Art in Mumbai" – National Gallery of Modern Art, Mumbai
 1998: "Harmony" – Nehru Centre, Mumbai
 1999: "Flashback-Flashforward" – Audio-Video Installation at Jehangir Art Gallery, Mumbai
 2000: "Jesus Christ"- National Gallery of Modern Art, Mumbai
 2001: The RPG Collection of Self Portraits – National Gallery of Modern Art
 2002: Artist with a Difference, who influenced the Art in India – NGMA
 2003: Auction: Of Masterpieces & Museum quality Indian Modern & Contemporary Paintings
 2004: 50 x 30: Montage Arts, New Delhi
 2005: "Art for God's Sake", India Habitat Centre, New Delhi
 2007: "India on Canvas", Khushii, Mumbai
 2009: "Black & White" Tao Art Gallery, Mumbai
 2010: "Evolve" Tao Art Gallery, Mumbai
 2011: Chivas Paintings at the Dubai Duty Free with Yusuf Arakkal from Bangalore and UAE artist Wael Hamdeh[11]
 2012: Solo Booth at India Art Festival (Tao Gallery, Mumbai)
 2013:  “Tagore, Lost & Found’ Art Bull (Art Gallery & Auction House) New Delhi
 2013/14/15: India Art Festival (Tao Gallery, Mumbai)
 2017: "Silent Spectacle" (Tao Gallery, Mumbai)

International group shows 
 1990: SUPERHUMANISM I & II: Marcus & Marcus Gallery (Amsterdam)
 1991: Series of Exhibitions with 'Nicholas Treadwell Gallery' (UK)
 1998: 50 Years of Independence: Hong Kong Land & Leasing and The Indian Consulate (Hong Kong)
 1998: Indian Contemporary Art: RPG & Bayer, Cologne (Germany)
 1998: Masters for a Child: Dubai (UAE)
 1999: Accentuart Group show: London (UK)
 1999: Towards The New Millennium: London (UK)
 2005: Colours on Canvas: Dubai (UAE)
 2005: Reflections Gallery (Hong Kong)
 2007: Auction for Magic Bus: Victoria & Albert Museum, London (UK)
 2008: “The Journey” New York Academy of Art (USA)
 2009: "First Impressions" Art Select, Dubai & Indian Embassy of Oman
 2009: 'Spectrum 2009' – Indian Art in Abu Dhabi (Emirates Palace) UAE

Other works 
 Mehrotra has produced movie titles and publicity stills for Split Wide Open, a 1999 Dev Benegal film
 Designed book covers for Vikram Chandra's Sacred Games, and Love and Longing in Bombay (Penguin India Ltd.), The Sixth Veda by Prashant Parikh (Hamilton & Co.Publ. London),  Rashmi Udaysingh's A Vegetarian in Paris and Young Rangers by Sunjoy Monga 
 He has also made short films on Amitabh Bachchan and Mahatma Gandhi, which were screened at the Kala Ghoda Arts Festival
 His short films were screened at The Short Film festival of Kerala and the Indo-British Digital Film festival of the British Council
 His video work ‘Hive’ was screened at Video Wednesday Finale, in Gallery Espace, New Delhi.
 His video works ‘Hive’ and ‘Within’ were screened at ‘Spectrum 2009,’ in Abu Dhabi, Emirates Palace, UAE
 He was commissioned a painting by Chivas Regal “25 Stories High” Exhibited in the Dubai Duty Free, UAE, for the duration of July to September 2011
 In 2001, Sula commissioned Mehrotra for a painting for a signature series. Mehrotra eventually designed the label and the look for the bottle of Sula's “Satori” wine, which is the highest selling wine in India.
 He was chosen to create the corporate calendar for Jindal Steel for the year 2002 
 Mehrotra was commissioned by RPG Art Foundation to do two public sculptures on Sachin Tendulkar. The first one, titled “Between the Lines” was composed of 12 vertical bars of carbon fibre and aluminum alloy. The second one, titled “MileStone” depicted Tendulkar's face using text
 Mehrotra's works of art were displayed at the Times of India Lit Fest in 2016

Influences 
In his youth, Mehrotra was influenced by the surrealist movement and artists such as Salvador Dalí and Bikash Bhattacharjee

Accolades 
 He was the first Indian artist to have his own web site, as well as the first Indian artist to have his own interactive CD-ROM
 One of 50 winners (out of 20,000 entries) in the International Digital Art Awards 2003 Exhibition, Australia
 Mehrotra was approached by a large diamond conglomerate to paint a portrait of Maharani Gayatri Devi. This turned out to be the last portrait of her painted before her death
 In January 2012, Mehrotra was listed as one of the artists whose works should be invested into, by Gulf News, one of the leading newspapers of the Middle East
 His work has been featured in and, in some cases on the covers of, top publications such as Elle Magazine, Reader's Digest, Hindustan Times, Verve, Times of India, etc. 
 Was named one of the ‘Top Artists From Mumbai You Ought to Know’ by CultureTrip

Personal life 
 He worked in various corporations in Bombay, Dubai and Africa, before returning to India to switch careers from a businessman to an artist
 Mehrotra married his wife Seema in 1989 and they have two daughters Anushka and Mallika.
 Mehrotra's interests in helping the underprivileged and the aged are well-known. His is also known to be environmentally conscious and a concerned citizen of Mumbai. He's helped numerous charitable causes over the years

External links
 Jaideep Mehrotra's web site
 Some Works by Jaideep Mehrotra
 Launch of CD-Rom
 THE IDEA #3
 Talk to Rotarians

Artists from Mumbai
1954 births
Living people
Indian male painters
Indian portrait painters
20th-century Indian painters
Painters from Maharashtra
20th-century Indian male artists